The Guam National Guard is a federally funded military force, part of the National Guard of the United States. Guam Army National Guard (GU ARNG) is the Army National Guard of Guam which, together with the Guam Air National Guard, comprises the Guam National Guard. GU ARNG is the ground component of the Guam National Guard under control of the governor of Guam that performs missions equivalent to those of the Army National Guards of the different states of the United States, including ground defense, disaster relief, and control of civil unrest.

The Guam Army National Guard also includes residents of the Commonwealth of the Northern Mariana Islands. A proposal has been introduced by U.S. Delegate Gregorio Sablan to form a National Guard unit in the Northern Mariana Islands, and feasibility studies are in progress in response to the proposal.

History
On June 27, 1980, Democratic U.S. House Delegate Antonio Won Pat of Guam introduced H.R. 7694 to the 96th United States Congress which would authorize the establishment of a National Guard unit in Guam. On December 24, 1980, President Jimmy Carter signed the bill into law as  Public Law 96-600. On June 5, 1981, Public Law 16-18 established the Guam Army National Guard and the Guam Air National Guard.

On August 6, 1997, the Guam Army National Guard assisted with the recovery efforts of Korean Air Flight 801, which crashed on approach to Antonio Won Pat International Airport. In December 1997, the Guam Army National Guard was activated by Guam Governor Carl Gutierrez to assist with relief and cleanup efforts after Supertyphoon Paka struck Guam, causing over $100 million in damage.

In 2002, members of the Guam Army National Guard's 1st Battalion, 294th Infantry Regiment and the 105th Troop Command were deployed to Afghanistan as a part of Operation Enduring Freedom. In October 2012, over 500 GU ARNG personnel formed Task Force Guam and trained at Camp Roberts, a California Army National Guard facility near Paso Robles, California prior to their deployment to Camp Phoenix near Kabul and other forward operating bases in Afghanistan. In April 2013, Task Force Guam replaced Task Force Centurion Prime, composed of 1st Battalion, 167th Infantry Regiment of the Alabama Army National Guard. Task Force Guam was the largest deployment in the history of GU ARNG and also included 17 soldiers who resided in the Northern Mariana Islands. Task Force Guam returned to Barrigada in December 2013 and was replaced in Afghanistan by Task Force Fury, composed of elements of the 508th Infantry Regiment, 82nd Airborne Division.

On June 10, 2015, the Guam Army National Guard gained its first aviation assets with the delivery of two UH-72 Lakota helicopters previously assigned to D Company, 1st Battalion, 224th Aviation Regiment, District of Columbia Army National Guard. The helicopters were delivered via a U.S. Air Force C-17 Globemaster II and transferred to the newly activated Detachment 2 within D Company. The aircraft are currently housed at Andersen Air Force Base and will eventually be based at a new complex to be built at the Guard Readiness Center in Barrigada.

As of January 2016, the Guam Army National Guard has about 1,300 members, with about 280 of them authorized as full-time support.

Structure
 Joint Force Headquarters Guam
 Army National Guard Element
 473rd Judge Advocate General Detachment
 1st Battalion, 294th Infantry Regiment
 Headquarters & Headquarters Company
 A Company
 B Company
 C Company
 D Company
 Detachment 2, Headquarters & Headquarters Battery, 1st Battalion, 487th Field Artillery Regiment
 105th Troop Command
 H Company, 29th Brigade Support Battalion
 1224th Engineer Company
 721st Army Band
 Detachment 2, D Company, 1st Battalion, 224th Aviation Regiment
 203rd Regiment — Multi-Functional Training Regiment (Regional Training Institute) 
 94th Civil Support Team
 Recruiting and Retention Battalion
 Medical Detachment

References

External links
Bibliography of Guam Army National Guard History compiled by the United States Army Center of Military History
Guam Army National Guard Economic Impact, from the Army National Guard
Guam Guard Deploys for OEF Mission

Military units and formations in Guam